The 2023 Chitwan–2 by-election will be held in the Chitwan 2 constituency of Nepal on 23 April 2023. The by-election will be held as the result of the vacation of the seat by the sitting member, Rabi Lamichhane, chairperson of the Rastriya Swatantra Party.

Background 
First elected in 2022, Lamichhane served as the Deputy Prime Minister and Minister of Home Affairs from 26 December 2022 to 27 January 2023, when he was stripped of all his elected positions after the Supreme Court ruled that Lamichhane did not follow due process to re-obtain his Nepali citizenship after renouncing his American citizenship, and thus, he was not a legal Nepali citizen. He reacquired the Nepali citizenship two days later, and is likely to contest the by-election.

2022 election result

References 

Chitwan District
By-elections in Nepal